Formin-binding protein 1 is a protein that in humans is encoded by the FNBP1 gene.

Function 

The protein encoded by this gene is a member of the formin-binding-protein family. The protein contains an N-terminal Fer/Cdc42-interacting protein 4 (CIP4) homology (FCH) domain followed by a coiled-coil domain, a proline-rich motif, a second coiled-coil domain, a Rho family protein-binding domain (RBD), and a C-terminal SH3 domain. This protein binds sorting nexin 2 (SNX2), tankyrase (TNKS), and dynamin; an interaction between this protein and formin has not been demonstrated yet in human.

Interactions 

FNBP1 has been shown to interact with:
 AKAP9,
 DNM1, 
 Fas ligand 
 SNX2,  and
 TNKS.

References

Further reading